East Berbice-Corentyne (Region 6) is one of ten regions in Guyana covering the whole of the east of the country. It borders the Atlantic Ocean to the north, the Nickerie District and Sipaliwini District of Suriname to the east, Brazil to the south and  the regions of Mahaica-Berbice, Upper Demerara-Berbice, Potaro-Siparuni and Upper Takutu-Upper Essequibo to the west.

Towns in the region include New Amsterdam, Corriverton and Rose Hall.

The Corentyne River forms the whole of the eastern border with Suriname, though the southernmost section is disputed territory known as the Tigri Area.

Population
The Government of Guyana has administered three official censuses since the 1980 administrative reforms, in 1980, 1991 and 2002.  In 2012, the population of East Berbice-Corentyne was recorded at 109,431 people. Official census records for the population of East Berbice-Corentyne are as follows:

2012 : 109,431
2002 : 123,695
1991 : 142,541
1980 : 152,386

Communities
(including name variants):

Adventure
Albion
Alness (Alnes)
Ankerville - Port Mourant
Baracara (Barakara Mission/Wel te Vreeden)
Belvedere
Bloomfield
Bound Yard - Port Mourant
Brighton
Bush Lot (Bush Lot Village)
Canefield
Chesney
Clifton Settlement - Port Mourant
Corriverton
Crabwood Creek
Cumberland ( birthplace of Hetmyer}.
Epira (Epira Mission, Espera)
Friendship (Friendship Village, Corentyne)
Free Yard - Port Mourant
Fyrish (Fyrish Village)
Gangaram
Haswell - Port Mourant
Johns Settlement - Port Mourant
Kasuela )Cashew Island)
Kumaka
Lancaster (Lancaster Village)
Leeds
Letter Kenny
Lesbeholden
Limlair
Liverpool
Manchester
Mibikuri
Miss Phoebe North And South- Port Mourant
Moleson Creek
New Amsterdam
New Hampshire
Number 43 (Joppa)
Number 46
Number 48 (Floyd Ward)
Number 55
Number 59
Number 60
Number 61
Number 62
Number 63 (Benab)
Number 64 (Babylon)
Number 67
Number 68 (Carnarvon)
Number 69 (Friendship)
Number 70 (Massiah)
Nurney
Orealla (Oreala, Orealla Mission)
Port Mourant (Port Mourant Village)
Portuguese Quarters - Port Mourant
Reliance
Rising (Rising Sun, Number 47)
Rose Hall
Skeldon (Skeldon Place)
Smythfield
Springlands (Springlands Place, Eliza and Mary)
Stanleytown
Tain Settlement - Port Mourant
Tain Resource - Port Mourant
Train Line Dam - Port Mourant
Ulverston
Whim
Williamsburg
Yakusari

See also

References

 
Regions of Guyana